Salvador Alanís Duque (born 9 November 1912, date of death unknown) was a Mexican athlete. He competed in the men's triple jump at the 1932 Summer Olympics, and was the first Mexican to compete in the event at the Olympics. Alanís also won bronze in the triple jump at the 1935 Central American and Caribbean Games, and a silver in the men's volleyball tournament at the 1938 Central American and Caribbean Games. He served as the vicepresident of the Mexican Athletics Federation (FMA) during the 1968 Summer Olympics, and as the technical director of the  during the 1974 Central American and Caribbean Games.

References

External links
 
 

1912 births
Year of death missing
Athletes (track and field) at the 1932 Summer Olympics
Mexican male triple jumpers
Mexican men's volleyball players
Olympic athletes of Mexico
Central American and Caribbean Games medalists in athletics
Central American and Caribbean Games silver medalists for Mexico
Central American and Caribbean Games bronze medalists for Mexico
People from San Luis Potosí City